Beechgrove is a cricket ground in Derry, Northern Ireland.

Origins
The first first-class match on the ground was in 1963, when it hosted a match between Ireland and Scotland.

Cricket
In local domestic cricket, the ground is the home of Brigade Cricket Club.

References

External links
Beechgrove on CricketArchive
Beechgrove on Cricinfo

Cricket grounds in Northern Ireland
Buildings and structures in Derry (city)
Sport in Derry (city)
Sports venues in County Londonderry